Sumo Group Limited is a British video game holding company based in Sheffield. It was formed in December 2017 as the parent company for Sumo Digital and Atomhawk, followed by its initial public offering on the London Stock Exchange later that month. Sumo Group's other subsidiaries are Pipeworks Studios (acquired in September 2020) and Secret Mode, a publisher established in March 2021. After purchasing a minority stake in Sumo Group in November 2019, Tencent wholly acquired the company in January 2022.

History 
Carl Cavers, Paul Porter, Darren Mills and James North-Hearn, four former members of the defunct Infogrames Studios, established the developer Sumo Digital in 2003. It was bought by Foundation 9 Entertainment in March 2008 before Cavers, Porter, Mills and Chris Stockwell completed a management buyout of the studio in November 2014. In December 2017, Sumo Group was formed in December 2017 as the parent company for Sumo Digital and its Atomhawk subsidiary. Sumo Group had its initial public offering on the London Stock Exchange (LSE) later that month.

In November 2019, the Chinese conglomerate Tencent acquired 15 million shares of Sumo Group, representing a 10% stake. Sumo Group acquired Pipeworks Studios in October 2020 and opened a publishing label, Secret Mode, in March 2021. At the time, Tencent was Sumo Group's second-largest shareholder at 8.75%.

In September 2021, Sumo Group acquired Auroch Digital, a Bristol-based developer, . Tencent's acquisition was approved by the Committee on Foreign Investment in the United States in December 2021, followed by the High Court of Justice on 13 January 2022. Sumo Group was consequently delisted from the LSE on 17 January and became a subsidiary of Tencent through the latter's Sixjoy Hong Kong Limited holding subsidiary.

On July 21st 2022, Sumo Group sold Pipeworks Studios to RuneScape developer Jagex for an undisclosed sum.

Subsidiaries 
 Atomhawk
 Atomhawk Canada
 Atomhawk United Kingdom
 Auroch Digital
 Secret Mode
 Sumo Digital
 Lab42
 PixelAnt Games
 Red Kite Games
 Sumo Leamington
 Sumo Newcastle
 Sumo Nottingham
 Sumo Pune
 Sumo Sheffield
 Sumo Warrington
 The Chinese Room

References

External links 
 

 
2017 establishments in England
2017 initial public offerings
2022 mergers and acquisitions
British companies established in 2017
British subsidiaries of foreign companies
Companies based in Sheffield
Companies formerly listed on the London Stock Exchange
Tencent divisions and subsidiaries
Video game companies established in 2017
Video game companies of the United Kingdom
Holding companies of the United Kingdom
Holding companies established in 2017